Bawang merah dan bawang putih  (Indonesian for Shallots and Garlic) is a popular traditional Malay and Indonesian folklore involving two siblings with opposite characters (one good and one bad), and an unjust step mother. The folktale has the similar theme and moral as the European folktale Cinderella.

The story centers on a pair of step sisters named Bawang Putih and Bawang Merah. Bawang Putih is the Indonesian name for garlic, while Bawang Merah is the Indonesian name for onion or shallot. This naming convention is in the same vein as the Western fairy tale sisters of Snow-White and Rose-Red although the previous do not get along as well. The use of these names for the female protagonist and her antagonist is symbolic of their physical similarity (both girls are beautiful) but have completely different personalities. Since the original folktale was passed on orally, different variations of the story exist. In some versions, Bawang Putih is the good and kind daughter, while Bawang Merah is the cruel and vindictive one. While in the 1959 black and white Malaysian movie, it is the other way around, the shallot being waterly bringing tears to the eyes and garlic being pungent. There are several version about the story of Bawang Merah and Bawang Putih, one involving a magic pumpkin and the other involved a magical fish. Curiously the second version is very similar to Sundanese folktale of Leungli the magical fish.

The origin of the story is obscure and unclear, some suggest that it was a Riau Sumatran Indonesian folktale, while some holds that it was originated from Yogyakarta in Java. Nevertheless, despite its unclear origin, the story is a popular children folktale in Indonesia

The story

First version 
In a village, live a widow with her two beautiful daughters, Bawang Merah (Red Onion or Shallots) and Bawang Putih (White Garlic). Bawang Putih's real father which was also the widows's husband died long ago. Bawang Merah and  Bawang Putih had opposite characters and personalities. Bawang Putih was diligent, kind, honest and humble. Meanwhile, Bawang Merah was very lazy, glamorous, proud and envious. Bawang Merah's bad personality was worsened because her mother spoiled her. The widow always gave her everything she wanted. It was Bawang Putih who did all the work in the house. Doing the laundry, cooking, cleaning, essentially all of the work were carried out by herself. Meanwhile, Bawang Merah and the widow just spent times making themselves up, because when they needed something they could just ask Bawang Putih.

Bawang Putih never complained the bad fate she had to face. She always served her stepmother and sister happily. One day, Bawang Putih was doing her stepmother and sister's laundry. Bawang Putih didn't realize it when a piece of cloth belonging to her mother was washed away by the river. How sad was she, thinking that if the cloth couldn't be found she would be blamed, and it wasn't impossible that she would be punished and expelled from home.

Being afraid that her mother's cloth could not be found, Bawang Putih kept looking and walked along the river with its strong current. Every time she saw someone by the river, she always asked them about her mother's cloth which was washed away by the river, but nobody knew where the cloth was. Eventually Bawang Putih came to a place where the river flowed into a cave, There was a very old woman in it. Bawang Putih  asked the old woman if she knew of the cloth's whereabouts. The woman knew where the cloth was, but she made a condition before she handed it to Bawang Putih, which was that she had to work assisting the old woman. Bawang Putih was used to working hard so her work pleased the old woman.
It was late afternoon and Bawang Putih was saying goodbye to the old woman. The woman handed the cloth to her. Because of her kindness, the old woman offered her a gift of pumpkins. There were two of them, one was larger than the other. Bawang Putih was asked to choose the gift she wanted. She wasn't greedy, therefore she chose the smaller one.

Returning home, the Step-Mother and Bawang Merah were furious because Bawang Putih was late. She told them what happened from the time her mother's cloth was washed away until her encounter with the old woman in the cave. Her stepmother was still furious because she was already late and only brought one small pumpkin, so the mother smashed the pumpkin to the ground. "Whack..." and the pumpkin was broken, but it was miraculous that in the pumpkin there were beautiful golden jewelry and diamond ornaments. The Widow and Bawang Merah were very shocked. They could get very rich with that much jewelry. But greedy they were, they yelled at Bawang Putih asking why she didn't take the large pumpkin instead. In the Widow and Bawang Merah's minds, if the larger pumpkin was taken, they should get much more jewelry.

Fulfilling their greed, Bawang Merah followed the steps told by Bawang Putih. She willingly let her mother's cloth drift away, walked along the river, asked people and eventually came to the cave where the old woman lived. Unlike Bawang Putih however, Bawang Merah refused the old woman's order to work for her and she even arrogantly ordered the old woman to give her the larger pumpkin, and so the old woman gave it to Bawang Merah.

Bawang Merah happily brought the pumpkin that the old woman gave, while imagining how much jewelry she would get. Returning home, the Widow welcomed her beloved daughter. Not long after, the pumpkin was smashed to the ground, but instead of jewelry, various terrifying venomous snakes (primarily cobra) appeared. The Widow and Bawang Merah finally realized what they had been doing all this time was wrong and asked Bawang Putih to forgive them.

Second version 
The story takes place in a simple village household. The head of this family has two wives, and each wife has their own daughter. The older of the two is Bawang Putih, while the younger one is Bawang Merah. Bawang Merah and her mother are jealous of the attention the father gives Bawang Putih and her mother, who is also older than her co-wife. When the father dies, Bawang Merah and her mother take charge of the household and bully both Bawang Putih  and her mother into servitude. Bawang Putih’s mother stands up for her daughter but she soon dies prematurely. One day, while washing the family's laundry in the river, Bawang Merah's mother pushed her into the water and left her to drown.

With her biological mother and father dead, the gentle and obedient Bawang Putih is left alone to be tortured by her cruel stepmother and half-sister. Though Bawang Putih suffers, she is patient. One day, when she is out in the woods, she sees a pond containing a live fish. The fish is able to speak, and tells her that it is her mother who has come back to comfort her. Bawang Putih is overjoyed to be able to speak with her mother again, and secretly visits the pond whenever she can.

One day Bawang Merah sees Bawang Putih sneaking off and secretly follows her to the pond, where she witnesses Bawang Putih talking to the fish. After Bawang Putih leaves, Bawang Merah lures the fish to the surface of the pond and catches it. Bawang Merah and her mother kill the fish, cook it and feed it to Bawang Putih without telling her where it came from. Once Bawang Putih finishes eating, her stepmother and stepsister reveal where they obtained the fish. Bawang Putih is repulsed and filled with remorse over this revelation.

Bawang Putih gathers the fish bones and bury them in a small grave underneath a tree. When she visits the grave the next day, she is surprised to see that a beautiful swing has appeared from one of the tree's branches. When Bawang Putih sits in the swing and sings an old lullaby, it magically swings back and forth.

Bawang Putih continues to visit the magic swing whenever she can. One day, while she is on the magic swing, a Prince who is hunting nearby hears her song. He follows the sound of her voice, but before he approaches her, Bawang Putih realizes that she is not alone, and she quickly runs back home.

The Prince and his advisors eventually find the home of Bawang Putih and Bawang Merah. (In some versions this happens immediately after the Prince's first sighting of Bawang Putih, but in other versions it happens after a long search made by the Prince's advisors). Bawang Merah's mother, seeing the opportunity, orders Bawang Putih to stay hidden in the kitchen. The Prince asks about the swing and the girl who sat in it. Bawang Merah's mother says that the girl he heard is her beautiful and talented daughter Bawang Merah. Though the Prince agrees that Bawang Merah is beautiful, he requests that she show him how she sang in the magical swing.

Bawang Merah and mother reluctantly follow the Prince and his advisors back to the magic swing. Bawang Merah sits in the swing and attempts to sing so that it will move, but she cannot. The Prince, now angry, orders Bawang Merah's mother to tell the truth. Bawang Merah's mother is forced to confess that she has another daughter hidden in her house.

The Prince brings Bawang Putih back to the swing, and as she had done many times before, the magic swing starts moving as soon as she begins singing. The Prince is overjoyed and asks Bawang Putih to marry him. She agrees and they live happily ever after.

Popular culture
The theme has become the inspiration for several films in both Indonesia and Malaysia.
Bawang Putih Bawang Merah, a 1959 Malaysian live-action musical, starring Latifah Omar as Bawang Merah, Umi Kalthom as Bawang Putih, and Mustapha Maarof as the Prince. This film adaptation does a twist in the characterizations where Bawang Putih is the bad stepsister whilst Bawang Merah is the good sister.
Bawang Putih Bawang Merah, a 1986 made-for-television Malaysian remake of the 1959 version.
Putih, a 2001 Malaysian animated film starring the voices of Erra Fazira as Putih, Raja Azura as Merah and M. Nasir as Putera Aftus.
Bawang Merah Bawang Putih, a 2004 Indonesian soap opera starring Revalina S. Temat as a good Bawang Putih and Nia Ramadhani as a bad Bawang Merah. The series was also widely popular in Malaysia, which led to a rerun not long after it ended months later.
Pohon Ajaib Berdaun Emas (Magic Tree with Golden Leaves), a 2006 Indonesian film starring Penty Nur Afiani, Chaterine Pamela, Afdhal Yusman, Sally Marcellina and Al-Indra.
Bawang Merah Bawang Putih: The Movie, 2006 Indonesian film starring Laudya Cynthia Bella, Eva Anindita, Nana Khairina and Ferry Irawan.
Bawang Merah, Bawang Putih dan Dua Raksasa (Red Onion, Garlic, and the Two Giants), 2007 Indonesian film starring Naima, Vina Kimberly, Lestya, dan Lysewati.

See also
Cinderella
Leungli
Rushen Coatie
The Golden Slipper
The Story of Tam and Cam
The Wonderful Birch
Vasilissa the Beautiful
Ye Xian
Diamonds and Toads

References

External links
Bawang Merah Bawang Putih from Folklore Indonesia
Bawang Putih Bawang Merah (1959) at FilemKita.com
Bawang Putih Bawang Merah (1959) at SinemaMalaysia.com
Putih  at FilemKita.com
Putih at SinemaMalaysia.com

Female characters in fairy tales
Javanese folklore
Malay folklore
Indonesian fairy tales
Indonesian folklore
Malaysian fairy tales
ATU 500-559